Aldo Omar Baéz (born 5 September 1988) is an Argentine footballer who plays as a midfielder for ŠTK Šamorín.

Club career

Trenčín
In January 2008, he joined the Corgoň liga club AS Trenčín. Baéz came to Trenčín together with fellow Argentine youngster David Depetris. Whilst at Trenčín, he became known for his physical style of play, which brought him numerous yellow cards. In July 2014, he left the club after almost seven years to join Czech side Slavia Prague.

Slavia Prague
Baéz penned a three-year contract upon his arrival at the Eden Arena. On 26 July, the midfielder made his competitive debut for the club in a 2-1 league victory over 1. FC Slovácko, when he came on at the interval.

External links

References

1988 births
Living people
Argentine footballers
Argentine expatriate footballers
Association football midfielders
Ferro Carril Oeste footballers
AS Trenčín players
SK Slavia Prague players
FC Spartak Trnava players
FK Železiarne Podbrezová players
ŠKF Sereď players
FC ŠTK 1914 Šamorín players
Slovak Super Liga players
Czech First League players
2. Liga (Slovakia) players
Expatriate footballers in Slovakia
Argentine expatriate sportspeople in Slovakia
Expatriate footballers in the Czech Republic
Argentine expatriate sportspeople in the Czech Republic
Footballers from Buenos Aires